The Black Spades are a mostly African-American street gang which started in the Bronx during the late 1960s and gained popularity in the 1970s. The gang began to spread from the Bronx to Manhattan, Queens, Brooklyn, Staten Island, New Rochelle, New Jersey, Massachusetts and Connecticut by the late 1980s. During this period Latino and white members were more common. The Black Spades have made a comeback in 2019 with more members joining. They are now TBS New Direction, a community service group championing anti-violence initiatives and providing food distribution for the food insecure.

History
The gang originated in 1968 in the Bronxdale Houses in the Soundview section of the Bronx. Although rumor says they were originally named the Savage Seven, the name from the start was the Black Spades. 

The Black Spades officially formed in Junior High School 123 on Morrison Ave in Soundview. Originally a teenage street organization, The Spades followed the teachings of The Five-Percent Nation, Malcolm X, the Nation of Islam, and were influenced by the Black Panthers and the Weather Underground Organization. Under the leadership of the original president David Brockington, who was a member of the Nation of Islam, the Spades organized to fight against the racism and bigotry in the Soundview, Clason Point, Parkchester, Castle Hill, and Throgs Neck neighborhoods of the Bronx. The 1st division Black Spades policed and protected Bronxdale Houses from the rise in crime, drug dealers, and heroin addicts who began to take over the 
community.

The gang quickly spread to nearby housing projects in the Soundview area (Monroe Houses, Soundview Houses, Bronx River Houses) and throughout the Bronx, starting a subculture inviting music in the lives of gang members. The Black Spades were also participants in the Hoe Avenue peace meeting. The Black Spades also included a women's division that started in Clason Point housing and Junior High School I.S. 131. 

By the early 1970s the Black Spades had increased in numbers and members began to lose focus of their original purpose. The Black Spades and younger members (Young Spades/Baby Spades) became violent and other divisions were unrestrained. David Brockington didn't like the direction that they were headed so he stepped down as 1st division president. Afterwards Monk became the new supreme president of the Black Spades which became a full-fledged street gang.

New York street gang activity peaked in 1973, and then began to decline. Reasons for this decline included violence and drug use as well as a move to the burgeoning hip hop culture in park jams, block parties and clubs.

Afrika Bambaataa was a warlord in a Black Spade division before becoming a famous hip hop DJ. He went on to form the Universal Zulu Nation on November 12, 1973;
 with several members following him.

Kool DJ Herc, an early hip hop music pioneer, credits gangs including the Black Spades with getting the hip hop scene started.

The organization had a strong following through the late 1990s. Around this time many young members of the organization transitioned their membership to the Bloods street gang of NYC.

In early 2022, a resurgence of Black Spades members have risen in the River Park Towers housing complex of the West Bronx. This latest incarnation of The Black Spades are a neighborhood self policing unit that has plans to participate in homeless food drives, after-school programs at CIS 229, other positive neighborhood development.

References

See also
Universal Zulu Nation
80 Blocks From Tiffany's

Former gangs in New York City
Street gangs
African-American gangs
Soundview, Bronx